Góreczno  (German: Bergvorwerk) is a village in the administrative district of Gmina Głogówek (Gemeinde Oberglogau), within Prudnik County, Opole Voivodeship, in south-western Poland, close to the Czech border.

However, though most of the area is now bilingual in German and Polish, this village is not because its population of German speakers was thoroughly eliminated after World War II.

History
The name of this village derived from its location; until 1945 it was called 'Bergvorwerk, meaning "estate on the mountain". The owners of the estate, amounting to 1000 hectares of arable land, were the von Gaffron-Prittwitz family, descendants of Hussars rewarded by Frederick the Great of Prussia for their loyalty with a large fief. After the death of the last member of the family, Alexander Friedrich von Gaffron-Prittwitz (1845-1923), his widow sold the estate, along with one in nearby Kasimir. The land was then parceled out into a dozen large farms, including one belonging to Alois Dambon of nearby Roschowitzwald. In the 1930s a waterworks for Oberglogau was built in the town. There is also a Neolithic archeological site in the town.

After 1945, when Silesia was given to Poland, the town was renamed Stroków, and then renamed again to Góreczno.

References

Villages in Prudnik County